Peter Olcott (April 25, 1733 – September 12, 1808) was a Vermont public official and military officer who served as a brigadier general in the colonial militia, the sixth lieutenant governor of the Vermont Republic, and the first lieutenant governor of the state of Vermont.

Early life
Born in Bolton, Connecticut Colony, Olcott moved to Norwich, Province of New Hampshire in the early 1770s and served in numerous local offices, including Overseer of the Poor, Justice of the Peace and County Judge.

Career
Olcott was active during the American Revolution.  He served as Sequestration Commissioner for Tory Property in 1777 and was a member of the Vermont House of Representatives in 1778. He was a colonel in the Vermont militia, and his regiment took part in the Battles of Bennington and Saratoga. From 1781 to 1788 Olcott was commander of the Vermont militia's Third Brigade with the rank of brigadier general.

Olcott was a member of the Governor's Council in 1779, and again from 1781 to 1790. He served on the Vermont Supreme Court from 1782 to 1784. He was Vermont's lieutenant governor from 1790 to 1794, and served in the Vermont House again in 1801.  Olcott was also a trustee of Dartmouth College from 1788 until his death.

Death
Olcott died in Hanover, Grafton County, New Hampshire, on September 12, 1808 (age 75 years, 140 days).  He is interred at Meeting House Hill Cemetery, Norwich, Windsor County, Vermont.

Family life
Son of Deacon Titus Olcott, he married Sarah Mills on October 11, 1759, and they had nine children, Pelatiah, Peter, Timothy, Roswell, Sarah, Margaret, Margaret, Mills, and Martha.

References

External links
 

1733 births
1808 deaths
People from Norwich, Vermont
Lieutenant Governors of Vermont
People of Vermont in the American Revolution
Justices of the Vermont Supreme Court
Vermont state court judges
People of pre-statehood Vermont
People from Bolton, Connecticut